Havet is a French-language surname. Notable people with the surname include:

Armand Havet (1795–1820), French botanist
Eugène Auguste Ernest Havet (1813–1889), French scholar
Mireille Havet (1898–1932), French poet, diarist, novelist, and lyricist

French-language surnames